Modern Art is an album by saxophonist Art Pepper featuring sessions recorded in late 1956 and early 1957 originally released on the Intro label. The album was reissued on CD on Blue Note Records with bonus tracks as Modern Art: The Complete Art Pepper Aladdin Recordings Volume 2 in 1988.

Track listing 
All compositions by Art Pepper, except where indicated.
 "Blues In" - 5:40
 "Bewitched" (Richard Rodgers, Lorenz Hart) - 4:25
 "When You're Smiling" (Larry Shay, Mark Fisher, Joe Goodwin) - 4:47
 "Cool Bunny" - 4:10
 "Dianne's Dilemma" - 3:46
 "Stompin' at the Savoy" (Edgar Sampson, Chick Webb, Benny Goodman, Andy Razaf) - 5:01
 "What Is This Thing Called Love?" (Cole Porter) - 6:00
 "Blues Out" - 4:53

Personnel 
Art Pepper - alto saxophone
Russ Freeman - piano
Ben Tucker - bass 
Chuck Flores - drums

References 

1957 albums
Art Pepper albums
Blue Note Records albums